The Silk Way Rally is an annual rally raid type of off-road race. The first Silk Way Rally was raced in 2009 from Kazan, Russia to Ashgabat, Turkmenistan. From 2010 to 2013, the race has taken place in Russia. The 2016 edition had a Moscow-Astana-Beijing route, the 2017 edition starts in Moscow and finishes in Xi'an, China.

From 2009 to 2011, the rally was part of ASO's Dakar Series. In previous editions several stages of Silk Way Rally also constituted a part of Russian Rally Championship as well as the FIA World Cup for Cross-Country Rallies.

Rules
Silk Way Rally is a rally raid that goes both through off-road spaces and by public roads. Each crew, which usually consists of a driver and a navigator (with a mechanic for truck crews and only of a rider for motorcycles), must complete the Selective Sections (also called Special Stages) of the itinerary indicated in the Road Book (the legend) and pass through all compulsory Waypoints. The crew with the shortest total time on all specials of rally route becomes the winner.

Road sections (or liaisons) between the specials go on public roads and highways and must be covered within the target time, observing Road Traffic Code. The failure to respect the target time incurs a penalty, which is marked on the control card (carnet) and is taken in account during the calculation of total results.

Since 2012 any competitor that fails to complete a special stage is allowed to continue the race with a penalty of 50 hours, added to the total time. This option can be used only one time and must be performed on the next day after the failed stage.

The rally compete in three categories: moto, cars and trucks. The motorcycle class was added in 2019. Along with the division into basic categories of moto, cars and trucks, each of them having its own overall classification, all vehicles that participate in Silk Way Rally are split into separate competition groups as required by FIA.

Winners

History

Summary

2009 

Edition 1 of the Silk Way Rally set off from Kazan in Tatarstan and headed to Ashgabat in Turkmenistan. The nine days, 4,500-km rally featured 3,900 km of special stages. Carlos Sainz won his 1st international Rally-Raid. A perfect rehearsal for "El Matador" who the following January won the Dakar Rally in his 4th attempt. In the truck category, Kamaz dominated with two-time Dakar winner Firdaus Kabirov taking top honours in what was his last major international victory.

PARTICIPATING COUNTRIES - 25

TOTAL ROUTE LENGTH - 4628 km

62 CARS AND 20 TRUCKS ENTERED THE MARATHON

34 CARS AND 16 TRUCKS FINISHED THE MARATHON

113 MEDIA ACCREDITED - 347 JOURNALISTS

753 TV-BROADCASTS WITH TOTAL DURATION OF 2,260 MINUTES

3,167 PUBLICATIONS IN MEDIA

TEAM SERVICE CARS - 96 CREWS

17 CREWS PRESENTED THE RAID CATEGORY

60 Т OF PETROL, 210 Т OF DIESEL FUEL AND 325 Т OF AVIATION KEROSINE WERE USED

ESCORT PROVIDED SUPPORT TO 160 VEHICLES OF PARTICIPANTS AND 120 VEHICLES OF 

ORGANIZATION COMMITTEE]
526 VIPS FROM FOUR STATES VISITED THE RALLY

2010 

PARTICIPATING COUNTRIES - 22

TOTAL ROUTE LENGTH - 4859 km

48 CARS AND 16 TRUCKS ENTERED THE MARATHON

29 CARS AND 13 TRUCKS FINISHED THE MARATHON

168 MEDIA ACCREDITED - 507 JOURNALISTS

918 TV-BROADCASTS WITH TOTAL DURATION OF 3,660 MINUTES

4,015 PUBLICATIONS IN MEDIA

TEAM SERVICE CARS - 96 CREWS

12 CREWS IN CARS AND MOTOBIKES PRESENTED THE RAID CATEGORY

51,675 L OF PETROL, 289,912 L OF DIESEL FUEL AND 160 Т OF AVIATION KEROSINE WERE USED

2011 

First departure from Moscow for the Silk Way Rally, which saw its number of entries rise, to the delight of the thousands of Muscovites who came to Red Square for the ceremonial start. Ahead of the competitors, seven days of racing and 3,983 km, with 2,366 km of special stages. After the week of hard-fought action it was Poland’s Krzysztof Holowczyc scoring the biggest win of his career, ahead of the disciplines greatest driver, Stéphane Peterhansel, while in the truck category, Alès Loprais got revenge from the previous year.

PARTICIPATING COUNTRIES - 28

TOTAL ROUTE LENGTH – 3,940 km

95 CARS AND 35 TRUCKS ENTERED THE MARATHON

50 CARS AND 26 TRUCKS FINISHED THE MARATHON

138 MEDIA ACCREDITED - 605 JOURNALISTS

969 TV-BROADCASTS WITH TOTAL DURATION OF 3,983 MINUTES

4,518 PUBLICATIONS IN MEDIA

TEAM SERVICE CARS - 153 CREWS

50,000 L OF PETROL, 551,700 L OF DIESEL FUEL AND 160 Т OF AVIATION KEROSINE WERE USED

2012 

The start once again from Red Square for the Silk Way Rally, which the number of entries is on the rise. On the programme, a completely new 4,000-km route to Sochi. Storms that battered southern Russian forced the race to stop at Gelendzhik.  Boris Gadasin became the first Russian driver to win in the car category, while Kamaz returned to its winning ways thanks to another of its young hopefuls, Ayrat Mardeev, the future winner of the 2015 Dakar!

PARTICIPATING COUNTRIES - 25

TOTAL ROUTE LENGTH – 3,550 km

118 CREWS: 93 JEEPS AND 25 TRUCKS ENTERED THE MARATHON

TEAM SERVICE CARS - 143 CREWS

270 MEDIA ACCREDITED - 581 JOURNALISTS

712 TV-BROADCASTS WITH TOTAL DURATION OF 2,074 MINUTES

4,312 PUBLICATIONS IN MEDIA

360 000L OF MOTOR FUEL ARE USED

2013

2016 

10735 km - total route length
17 days - rally duration, 14 bivouacs
41 countries presented their participants 
1,100 participants and team members
More than 2,500 people in Europe, Russia and China in the Rally organization
145 Russian and international journalists received permanent accreditation
560 media representatives received temporary accreditation
TV reports from the "Silk Way 2016" Rally were broadcast in 196 countries of Europe, North and South America, Asia and Africa 
Bivouac hosted up to 2,200 people daily
550 vehicles arrived daily to the bivouac and went further along the rally route 
125 sports crews (102 SUVs and 23 trucks) entered the rally
192 "Assistance" crews
Up to 15,000 people visited the spectator areas along the rally route every day
16 aircraft
14 auto transporters moved along the rally route

2017 

For the Silk Way Rally of year 2017 the Organization Committee prepared a new route project, which includes the best features of the 6th edition as well as some developments and surprises. The rally once again took the form of a marathon through Russia, Kazakhstan and China, which proved itself successful last year. The rally's organisation was commended by the Russian President Vladimir Putin.

2018 

• The distance of the route of the Silk Way Rally 2018 (Russian part) - 5169 km,  3127 are special stages

• 94 crews took part

• Permanently accredited media - 214

• TV channels - 85

• 196 broadcast countries

• 3,500 people took rally bivouacs daily

• Up to 20,000 people were in spectator areas daily

• 13 aircraft of aviation support (6 aircraft, 7 helicopters)

2019 

On 6 July 2019 the Rally officially took off from Irkutsk.

2020 
The 2020 Silk Way Rally was cancelled due to the COVID 19 pandemic.

2021 
The 2021 Silk Way Rally was held but the Mongolian portion was cancelled due to COVID-19 and bubonic plague outbreaks in the country.

2022

Podium

Cars

Trucks

Moto

Quads

Notes

External links
 

 
Rally raid races
Auto races in Russia
Rally competitions in Russia
Auto races in Mongolia
Rally competitions in Mongolia
Auto races in China
Rally competitions in China